Bowles Outdoor Centre  is an outdoor education/outdoor learning centre in southeast England, located between Royal Tunbridge Wells and Crowborough at Bowles Rocks. The centre was founded in 1961 and became a charity in 1964. It provides residential personal development courses for children and young people through outdoor and adventurous activities.

History and the Charitable Trust 
Bowles was purchased in the early 1960s and set up by John Walters a visionary founder who titled his creation The Bowles Rock Climbing Gymnasium.  In 1964 the Bowles Rocks Trust was created as an independent charity whose aim is to support young people through outdoor learning and development.

During the 1980s the teambuilding and experiential learning arm of Bowles was developed in order to help raise money for the charity's work with young people – an early social enterprise model. Bowles L&D has worked with many local and multinational companies over the years and continues to support the charity today.  The Bowles Organisation runs leadership development, team development and team-building courses for businesses, particularly apprentices.

Present day 
Bowles is an outdoor education and learning centre at Bowles Rocks. It is located in East Sussex near the Kent border, about five miles south of Tunbridge Wells, postcode TN3 9LW.

The centre has 140 beds, two ski slopes, an indoor pool, archery range and high ropes courses as well as the Bowles Rocks sandstone crag.  The centre specialises in residential courses, outdoor activities, personal and team development and experiential learning.  It is a valuable regional resource for schools, youth and community groups, businesses and families.

Notable people
The patrons of the trust include the Duke of Edinburgh, Brian Blessed and Richard Branson. Sir Peter Jennings, formerly Serjeant-at-Arms of the House of Commons, served as the charities chairman from 2004 to 2010.

References

 Outdoors Pal.com

Charities based in East Sussex
Rotherfield